Beyond Castle Wolfenstein is a 1984 World War II stealth game. A direct sequel to Castle Wolfenstein, it is the second game in the Wolfenstein series, and the last installment to be released by original developer Muse Software before the name was revived for a first-person shooter in 1991. Castle Wolfenstein was written solely by Silas Warner for the Apple II, while the sequel was developed simultaneously for the Apple II and Commodore 64 by Warner, Eric Ace, and Frank Svoboda III. It was quickly ported to the Atari 8-bit family and MS-DOS.

Gameplay
Like its predecessor, Beyond Castle Wolfenstein is a combination action and adventure game with stealth elements. It is set in World War II during Adolf Hitler's rule as Chancellor of Germany. The objective is to traverse the levels of the secret Berlin bunker where the Führer is holding meetings with his senior staff. The player must retrieve a bomb that operatives have hidden inside the bunker, place it outside the room where Hitler is holding a meeting, and escape before the bomb explodes.

The game shows a top-down view of each room, though the characters are from a side view. The player explores the levels by sneaking by, impersonating, and sometimes killing opponents. The game is controlled via a joystick, paddles, or the keyboard, although the keyboard is the only option that allows for all commands.

The play is similar to its predecessor, but with some updates. The guards use a pass system, in which the player is periodically summoned by guards and asked to show the correct pass (which varies by floor), or offer a bribe.  If an incorrect pass is shown or the bribe is rejected due to the lack of money (for a total of two times), the guard will attempt to activate a bunker-wide alarm or kill the player. The bodies of dead guards can be dragged through the room to conceal them, block passages, or gain access to objects. The grenades of the previous game have been replaced with a dagger which can silently kill guards. Upon successful completion of the game, the player is rewarded with a high resolution image of the bunker exploding with the player running away in the foreground.

Reception
Harvey Berstein of Antic wrote in 1985 of the Atari 8-bit version: "while there have been some minor improvements, the game play doesn't provide nearly as much depth as the documentation suggests." He criticized the game for having the same Apple II-like graphics as its predecessor and slow loading speed. He also pointed out, "Once you know which passes to use, you can breeze through the game", discouraging replay.

In January 1985, Computer Entertainer rated the Atari 8-bit version 5½ out of 8 stars.

A 1991 Computer Gaming World survey of strategy and war games gave it two stars out of five.

References

 Ahoy! July 1984.
 Atari Computer Enthusiasts. March 1985.
 Personal Software. August 1984.
 Softalk. July 1984.
 Video Game Update. July 1984.

External links

Beyond Castle Wolfenstein at Atari Mania

1984 video games
Apple II games
Atari 8-bit family games
Commercial video games with freely available source code
Commodore 64 games
Cultural depictions of Adolf Hitler
Muse Software games
Single-player video games
Stealth video games
Video games about Nazi Germany
Video games developed in the United States
Wolfenstein
World War II video games